Maria Bueno and Margaret Court were the defending champions but Maria Bueno did not compete this year. 

Margaret Court teamed up with Virginia Wade, and lost in the final 0–6, 6–3, 6–4 against Françoise Dürr and Darlene Hard.

Seeds

Draw

Finals

Top half

Bottom half

References

External links
1969 US Open – Women's draws and results at the International Tennis Federation

Women's Doubles
US Open (tennis) by year – Women's doubles
US Open – Women's Doubles
US Open – Women's Doubles